The Fantastic Film Festival of the University of Málaga, also known as Fancine Málaga, has been celebrated annually since 1990 in the city of Málaga, Spain, and it focuses on the fantastic, science-fiction and horror movie genres. It is celebrated in the month of November.

Considered one of the oldest festivals of the Andalusian audiovisual landscape and one of the most important in Spain of this genre, it is a member of the European Fantastic Film Festivals Federation (EFFFF). It distinguishes itself for being the only international festival financed by a public university, the University of Málaga

History
The festival was started in 1990, initially called the "International Week of Fantastic Cinema of the University of Málaga", as a fantastic genre film exhibition. The promoter of the idea was Ramón Reina, who held the position of director during 19 editions.

In its first years, the festival presents a collection of the best fantasy films in the history of the fantastic genre. In 1997, it assumed an international competition character, emphasising fantastic contemporary films that are being produced, apart from the classic movies sample.

In the 2008 edition, the organization was renamed the International Fantastic Film Festival, and its hallmark is Fancine. Oscar Marine (author of works made for Julio Médem, Álex de la Iglesia and Pedro Almodóvar) created the new logo and posters.

In the 2010 edition, Fernando Ocaña, is appointed the new director. He will be responsible for managing the festival until 2013.

Since 2014, a committee is in charge of the direction of the festival. This committee is constituted by members of the different academic sections of the University of Málaga: professors, students and administrative and services staff.

Objectives
The presentation of a selection of the best world film production of feature as well as short films of fantastic genre under all its
variants (fantasy, science-fiction, terror, adventures, thriller, etc.), as well as promoting and disseminating the cinematographic culture. Furthermore, Fancine, being organized by the University of Málaga, a non-profit institution, attempts to create a more universal and affordable access to its offering of the best fantastic films.

Contents

Competition sections
FEATURE FILMS IN COMPETITION. Recent productions of international feature films in competition.
REAL-IMAGE SHORT FILMS. Official section. Recent productions of real image short films in competition.
ANIMATED SHORT FILMS. Official section. Recent productions of short films realized with any animation technique in competition.
ONLINE SHORT FILMS. Official section. Productions of less than five minutes duration voted through the web.

Out of competition sections
INFORMATIVE SECTION. Selection of recent productions of interest.
CLASSICS. Selection of the best fantasy films of all times.
FAMILY FANTASTIC. Movies for all audiences.
HORROR ZONE. Movies for fans of the genre in its most extreme side.
TRIBUTES. Cycles commemorating an event or a personality related to the fantasy genre.

Winners

Awards by the Official Jury

Best feature film

Awards with financial grant
 Best Feature film (9.000 euros)
 Best Fiction Short film (3.000 euros)
 Best Animation Short film (3.000 euros)

Honorary awards
 Best director
 Best actor
 Best actress
 Best original or adapted screenplay
 Best photography
 Best special effects
 Selection of the Best European Fantasy Short Film for the GOLD MÉLIÈS AWARD

Awards by the Young Jury

Awards with financial grant
Best Real-image short film (3.000 euros)
Best Animation short film (3.000 euros)

Honorary awards
Silver Méliès to the best fantastic European short film and selection of the same to compete for the Gold Méliès award in this category

Public awards

Honorary awards
Best feature film (1.000 euros)
Best Real-Image short film (500 euros)
Best Animation short film (500 euros)

Parallel activities
Over the years, a program of parallel activities as important as the film program has arisen, always with an academic character: lectures from specialists from the University of Málaga or other universities, encouragement of the university community participation, etc. Sometimes these activities span the dates of the festival, but they are organized under it: audiovisual campus, book editions, film premieres, etc.

Fancine Educational Project

Its main objective is to raise awareness of the importance and value of film and, in particular, of the fantastic genre, among children and young people from Málaga; as well as promoting an understanding of the University of Málaga among this audience, which represent the would-be pool of future academics.

Music
 Original Soundtracks Concert. With the best film music, by the Málaga Provincial Symphony Orchestras and Chamber Choir of the University of Málaga.

Exhibitions
 Fantastic and terror. Exhibition of film posters from the collection of Lucio Romero.
 Fantasy comic frames: Andalusian comic authors. Carlos Pacheco, artist of Fantastic 4, Superman, Conan, The Avengers; Jesus Barony, illustrator of Conan, Juanjo RyP, Robocop cartoonist, etc.
 Kinetic Totems, an exhibition of sculptures by Patrice Hubert.

Contests
Fantastic tale contests
Illustratrion and Comic contests
Short films projects

Book publishing
 The eyes of the Buñuel, Miguel Angel Martin and Antonio Sempere, on the occasion of the tenth edition.
 A long road to the stars, Miguel Ángel Martín, Antonio Sempere and Iván Reguera. In commemoration of the film 2001, A Space Odyssey, Stanley Kubrick.
 Lon Chaney, the man of a thousand faces, Jose Miguel Pallares and José Luis Torres Murillo.
 The adventure fantasy film, by Carlos Aguilar.
 Fear suggestive. Val Lewton and fantasy and horror films for RKO, Francisco García Gómez.
 The science fiction film. Exploring worlds, several authors coordinated by José Antonio Navarro. Published in conjunction with the Fantastic Film Festival of Catalonia, Sitges.
 Mystery and imagination. Edgar Allan Poe, Literature to Film, several authors coordinated by Juan Antonio Perles and Sara Robles. Published for the XIX Fancine to commemorate the 200th birthday of the American writer.

Roundtable discussions, conferences, lectures and symposia
 Conference of Gonzalo Suarez about his films.
 Roundtable discussion: Serial Murderers, involving, among others, the psychiatrist Luis Rojas Marcos.
 Talks cycle Jules Verne with Antonio Garrido Moraga, César Pérez de Tudela and Manuel Toharia.
 Roundtable discusión: Fantastic Literature in Cinema, with José Luis Garci, Juan Manuel de Prada and Eduardo Torres Dulce.
 The Templars: myths and reality, lecture by Juan Eslava Galán.
 Conference on ancestral ethnicities and cultures, by Luis Pancorbo (producer of the documentary program Other villages).
 Talk-symposium on natural forces, by Javier Trueba (documentary) and John M. Ruiz Garcia, a specialist in Crystallography at the University of Granada.
 Roundtable: Present and future of fantasy films, with the participation, among others, critics Latorre and José M. ª José Antonio Navarro.
 Lecture by Sebastián Álvaro. Programme director of The Edge of the impossible.
 Roundtable: The moon, traveling companion. Presented by Sebastian Cardenete (director of the Center for Science Principia) and various teachers of UMA.

Radio programs
 XVI Edition: Millennium 3. Radio program of Cadena SER, with Iker Jiménez. Live broadcast in the auditorium of the university.
 XIX Edition: The compass rose. Directed by Bruno Cardeñosa. Live broadcast in the auditorium of the university.

Other activities
 Seminar "The assistant director in cinema", by Carlos Gil, film and television director and assistant director to Steven Spielberg.
 I and II Film Campus of the University of Málaga, with the participation of the directors Paul Berger (Torremolinos 73), Brian Yuzna (Beyond Reanimator, The Dentist) and Juanma Bajo Ulloa (Wings, Airbag), Gracia Querejeta (Seven French billiard tables), Nacho Vigalondo (Timecrimes) and Jack Sholder (The Hidden).
 Production of the documentary Jesus Franco. Manera, a way of life.
 comics and fantasy illustrations contest of for pre-university students.
 Fancine UMA Fantastic tales Contest.
 Start of course "The boarding school": meeting with actors, director and responsible for the series "The boarding school", Antena 3.

Participation of relevant personalities in the Festival
 The actress Tippi Hedren was homaged before the screening of "The Birds" movie directed by Alfred Hitchcock.
 The actor Michael Ironside, known for his roles in fantastic genre productions, such as "Starship Troopers", "Total recall" and "The machinist".
 The actor Rutger Hauer was homaged for his role in "Blade Runner".
 The actress Linda Blair, main actress of "The Exorcist".
 The actress Susan George, main actress of "Straw dogs".
 The actors Jimmy Barnatán and Simón Andreu, homaged for their contribution to outstanding national and international productions of the fantastic genre.
 Narciso Ibáñez Serrador, colloquium meeting and screening of "Who can kill a child?" movie.
 Luis Eduardo Aute, colloquium meeting and screening of "A dog called pain" movie.
Other prominent personalities who attended Fancine include: directors Jorge Grau, Jesús Franco, Agustí Villaronga, Joaquim Jordá, Brian Yuzna and José Luis Garci, cinema historian Carlos Aguilar, writer Juan Manuel de Prada, fashion designer Elena Benarroch, actors John Phillip Law, Paul Naschy, Karra Elejalde, Dolph Lundgren, and Ivana Baquero.

References

External links

Film festivals in Spain
Fantasy and horror film festivals
Science fiction film festivals